The small ke is a Japanese character, typographically a small form of the katakana character  ke.

While identical in shape to a small ,  is actually an abbreviation for the kanji , specifically by writing half of the bamboo radical .

It is unrelated to the katakana character  (which is an abbreviation for ) but  is sometimes written as a large character . 

Although it resembles the katakana character ke, it is pronounced ka (sometimes ko) when it specifies a counter (or ga when it specifies a conjunction), but not ke. 

When used as a counter but pronounced ko, the katakana  is sometimes used instead (chiefly in informal writing). 

Other common examples are places 　(~-ka-sho) and countries  (~-ka-koku).

An example where it is pronounced as ko is when counting small objects, such as pieces of fruit or candy, where one may write  (ik-ko), rather than the more formal ; this is particularly common in hand-written signs at shops, though  is also common.

One relatively common word using  is  karigane (kari-ga-ne – goose-'s-sound, the cry of the wild goose).

This may have also changed over time, so older documents may use a different form, and older institutions may use an outdated spelling.

External links

 Monash FAQ

Japanese writing system
Japanese vocabulary